Katelyn Jong (born July 28, 2006) is an American artistic gymnast and a member of the United States women's national gymnastics team.  She is the 2021 U.S. Junior National Champion.

Early life 
Jong was born to Simon and Yoomin Jong in 2006 in Allen, Texas.  She started gymnastics in 2010.

Gymnastics career

HOPEs

2018–19 
In 2018 Jong was part of the USA Gymnastics HOPEs program.  She competed at the Buckeye National Qualifier and the KPAC National Qualifier.  At the latter she earned her qualifying score to compete at the Hopes Classic.  Jong finished 26th at the Hopes Classic.

In 2019 Jong re-qualified as a Hopes gymnast at the World Champion's National Qualifier.  At the HOPEs Classic Jong co-won the all-around title alongside Michelle Pineda and Paityn Walker.  Additionally she won the uneven bars title and placed fifth on vault, twelfth on balance beam, and fourteenth on floor exercise.  Jong next competed at the HOPEs Championships where she placed third in the all-around.  She won gold on the uneven bars, bronze on vault, and place sixth and eighth on balance beam and floor exercise respectively.

Junior Elite

2020 
Jong qualified as a junior elite in early 2020.  In March Jong was selected to compete at International Gymnix, taking place in Montreal alongside Skye Blakely, Kaliya Lincoln, and Konnor McClain.  As a result, she was added to the junior national team for the first time.  While there she helped the USA win team gold.

2021 
Jong competed at the WOGA Classic in February where she placed first.  She next competed at the Winter Cup where she placed eighth in the all-around after falling off the balance beam.  She placed first on vault.  At a National Team camp Jong was added to the national team for the second time.  Jong next competed at the American Classic where she only competed on the uneven bars and balance beam.  She finished second on uneven bars behind Kailin Chio and first on balance beam.

In late May Jong competed at the U.S. Classic where she placed first in the all-around and on vault, uneven bars, and balance beam.  She finished second on floor exercise behind Kaliya Lincoln.  In June Jong competed at her first National Championships.  She ended the two day competition first in the all-around with a combined score of 107.400, over three points ahead of second-place finisher Madray Johnson.  Additionally she won gold on the uneven bars, silver on floor exercise behind Lincoln, bronze on vault behind Chio and Joscelyn Roberson, and placed eighth on balance beam.  As a result, Jong was added to the national team for the third time.  Additionally Jong was selected to represent the United States at the Junior Pan American Championships alongside Johnson, Lincoln, and Chio.

At the Junior Pan American Championships Jong helped the USA finish first in the team final.  Individually she won gold in the all-around, on vault (tied with compatriot Lincoln), and on uneven bars.  She won silver on balance beam behind Johnson.

In November Jong was selected to represent the United States at the inaugural Junior Pan American Games alongside Kailin Chio, Madray Johnson, and Tiana Sumanasekera.  While there the United States placed first as a team and individually Jong won gold in the all-around and silver on vault and balance beam.

Senior elite

2022 
Jong made her senior debut at the 2022 Winter Cup where she placed fifth in the all-around.  As a result she was selected to compete at the upcoming DTB Pokal Mixed Cup in Stuttgart.  In August Jong competed at the National Championships.  She finished finished ninth in the all-around.  In September Jong competed at the Szombathely Challenge World Cup alongside Addison Fatta and Levi Jung-Ruivivar.

In October Jong verbally committed to compete for the Auburn Tigers, starting in the 2024–25 season.

Competitive history

References

External links
 
 

2006 births
Living people
American female artistic gymnasts
Gymnasts from Texas
U.S. women's national team gymnasts
People from Allen, Texas
21st-century American women